Le Creusot TGV station (French: Gare du Creusot TGV, officially Le Creusot-Montceau-Montchanin) is a railway station on the LGV Sud-Est providing TGV high-speed train services to the city of Le Creusot, Saône-et-Loire, France. It was inaugurated on 22 September 1981 by President François Mitterrand and opened to commercial service five days later. The station, located outside the city in the commune of Écuisses, is accessible by road.

The station is arranged with two side tracks with platforms for stopping trains, in addition to two centre tracks for non-stopping trains to pass at full speed.

Situation
By road, the station is 8 km from Le Creusot and 15 km from Montceau-les-Mines.

The next northbound station on LGV Sud-Est is Paris-Gare de Lyon (terminus); the next southbound station is the Gare de Mâcon-Loché TGV. TGV journey times from the station to Paris are 1 hour 20 minutes on average. Lyon is 40 minutes on average. Prior to the opening of the LGV Sud-Est, average times were 3 hours 40 minutes to Paris with a train change in Dijon or Nevers; Lyon was 1 hour 30 minutes away with a train change in Chagny or Chalon-sur-Saône.

55 km north of the station is the highest point on the line at 489 m above sealevel, near the town of Liernais. This is near the range dividing the Seine and Loire river valleys, not far from the Rhône river valley.

See also 
 List of TGV stations

References

External links 
 

Railway stations in France opened in 1981
Railway stations in Saône-et-Loire